Xestia fennica is a species of moth belonging to the family Noctuidae. It was formerly considered a subspecies of Xestia rhaetica.

References

Xestia
Moths described in 1936